Henry Johnson (born 1824, date of death unknown) was a Union Navy sailor in the American Civil War and a recipient of the U.S. military's highest decoration, the Medal of Honor, for his actions at the Battle of Mobile Bay.

Born in 1824 in Norway, Johnson immigrated to the United States and was living in New York when he joined the Navy in 1857. Despite intense fire, the boat crew was able to pull ten Tecumseh men from the water. For this action, Johnson was awarded the Medal of Honor three years later, on February 23, 1867. Five other members of the boat crew also received the medal: Seaman James Avery, Quarter Gunner Charles Baker, Ordinary Seaman John C. Donnelly, Captain of the Forecastle John Harris, and Landsman Daniel Noble.

Johnson's official Medal of Honor citation reads:
As seaman on board the U.S.S. Metacomet, Johnson served as a member of the boat's crew which went to the rescue of the U.S. Monitor Tecumseh when that vessel was struck by a torpedo in passing the enemy forts in Mobile Bay, 5 August 1864. He braved the enemy fire which was said by the admiral [ David Farragut ] to be "one of the most galling" he had ever seen, and aided in rescuing from death 10 of the crew of the Tecumseh, thereby eliciting the admiration of both friend and foe.

References 

1824 births
Year of death unknown
Norwegian emigrants to the United States
People of New York (state) in the American Civil War
Union Navy sailors
United States Navy Medal of Honor recipients
Norwegian-born Medal of Honor recipients
American Civil War recipients of the Medal of Honor